is a Japan-only role-playing game for the Family Computer that is similar to Jinsei Game, which is the Japanese version of The Game of Life.

Gameplay

The object is to explore a city full of stores, places of employment, and learning places. Starting from home, the player must earn money and statistics in order to unlock the better features of the game.

Unlike most games based on the Jinsei Game series, RPG Jinsei Game does not use a spinner system. Instead, the controller pad is used for movement and random encounters are featured like in Dragon Quest. The player can also talk to strangers, who might either give advice or do something malevolent to the player character. As in the Game of Life board game, the player has to choose from a range of careers such as musician, photographer, and even professional wrestler. Most of these tasks are mundane, while one of the quests involves chasing down unidentified flying objects. Buildings that are crucial to the quest (other than shops and learning places) can be fully explored; otherwise the player simply talks to the resident.

Fights can occur like in a standard role-playing game. However, the player's stats are used instead of hit points and magic points.

References

1993 video games
Japan-exclusive video games
Nintendo Entertainment System games
Nintendo Entertainment System-only games
Social simulation video games
Takara video games
Video games developed in Japan
Multiplayer and single-player video games